Nana Addo Welbeck-Maseko (born 24 November 1994) is a Ghanaian professional footballer who plays as a midfielder for Italian  club Catanzaro.

Career

Brescia
In December 2009, Welbeck signed a five-year deal with Serie B team Brescia. 

Welbeck's professional debut came on 22 May 2011, in a 2–2 draw against Fiorentina, coming on for the final 30 minutes of the Serie A season.

During the 2011–12 Serie B season, Welbeck made two first-team appearances, including his first start against Crotone on the final matchday of the season. The majority of Welbeck's playing time came in the Campionato Nazionale Primavera Group B, scoring four goals in 24 games.

Welbeck again featured mainly in the Campionato Primavera Group B in the 2012–13 season, only playing the one first team game against Spezia Calcio and being an unused substitute eight times.

Atalanta and Krka
Welbeck signed with Atalanta on 25 August 2014. Five days later, he joined Slovenian PrvaLiga club Krka on a season-loan, which was made into a permanent deal the following summer. While at Krka, he played 61 league games and scored 5 league goals.

OB
Welbeck signed a two-year contract with Danish Superliga club Odense Boldklub on 3 August 2016. He left the club in 2018 after the expiry of his contract, making 15 total appearances through two seasons.

Mladost Doboj Kakanj
On 9 July 2018, Welbeck signed a two-year contract with Premier League of Bosnia and Herzegovina club FK Mladost Doboj Kakanj. He made his competitive debut for Mladost on 29 July 2018 in a 4–0 away loss to FK Sarajevo.

The first goal he scored for the club was on 24 November 2018, in a 3–0 away win against NK Čelik Zenica.

Catania
On 28 June 2019, Welbeck had to leave Mladost return to Ghana for private reasons.
On 8 July 2019 he signed a two-year contract with Catania. He scored a beautiful goal during the first match of the season, between Avellino and Catania, which finished 6–3.

Catanzaro
On 7 July 2021 he signed a two-year contract for Catanzaro. He made his competitive debut for the club on 7 August, starting against Como in the Italian Cup as his team advanced after winning the penalty shootout.

Career statistics

Club

References

External links
NZS profile 

1994 births
Living people
Footballers from Kumasi
Ghanaian footballers
Association football midfielders
Serie A players
Serie B players
Serie C players
Brescia Calcio players
Atalanta B.C. players
Catania S.S.D. players
U.S. Catanzaro 1929 players
Slovenian PrvaLiga players
NK Krka players
Danish Superliga players
Odense Boldklub players
Premier League of Bosnia and Herzegovina players
FK Mladost Doboj Kakanj players
Ghanaian expatriate footballers
Ghanaian expatriate sportspeople in Italy
Ghanaian expatriate sportspeople in Slovenia
Ghanaian expatriate sportspeople in Denmark
Ghanaian expatriate sportspeople in Bosnia and Herzegovina
Expatriate footballers in Italy
Expatriate footballers in Slovenia
Expatriate men's footballers in Denmark
Expatriate footballers in Bosnia and Herzegovina